Follow Me Up (stylized as FOLLOW ME UP) is the ninth studio album by Japanese singer Maaya Sakamoto. It was released on September 30, 2015, through FlyingDog. The limited edition came with a DVD including the music videos for the singles "Hajimari no Umi", "Be Mine!", "Replica" and "Shiawase ni Tsuite Watashi ga Shitte Iru Itsutsu no Hōhō".

Commercial performance
Follow Me Up entered the daily Oricon Albums Chart at number 5. It moved up two spots to number 3 the following day, selling 6,000  copies. The album stayed at number 3 on its third day on the chart, selling 2,000 copies. Follow Me Up debuted at number 4 on the weekly Oricon Albums Chart, with 15,000 copies sold in its first week, marking Sakamoto's fifth consecutive studio album to debut within the top ten. The album charted for twelve weeks, selling a reported total of 22,000 copies.

Track listing

Charts

References

External links
 Follow Me Up official website

2015 albums
Maaya Sakamoto albums
FlyingDog albums